This article lists the heads of government of Dominica. 

The Prime Minister of Dominica is the head of government under the system implemented by the Constitution of 1978, the year of Dominica's independence.

The current Prime Minister of Dominica is Roosevelt Skerrit, since 8 January 2004.

Chief ministers of Dominica (1960–1967)

Premiers of Dominica (1967–1978)

Prime ministers of Dominica (1978–present)
Status

See also 

List of presidents of Dominica
Premier of Dominica
Prime Minister of Dominica
Lists of office-holders

External links
PRIME MINISTERS OF THE COMMONWEALTH OF DOMINICA

Dominica, List of heads of government of
 
Prime Ministers